British Expertise is a trade organization based in London that promotes British companies internationally.

History
The British Overseas Engineering Services Bureau was formed in 1966. It was initially financed by the Government's Board of Trade, and also liaised with the British National Exports Council. It became the British Consultants Bureau in 1967. The British Consultants and Construction Bureau (BCCB) was formed from the merger of the British Consultants Bureau and the International Construction Group in 2000. The organisation changed its name to British Expertise in August 2006.  During early 2015 part of the organisation joined with The D Group to become British Expertise International.

Function
It promotes British companies and their professional services abroad.

References

External links
 British Expertise

Foreign trade of the United Kingdom
Organizations established in 1966
International trade organizations
Business organisations based in the United Kingdom
1966 establishments in the United Kingdom